Psalm 82 is the 82nd psalm of the Book of Psalms, beginning in English in the King James Version: "God standeth in the congregation of the mighty; he judgeth among the gods.". In the slightly different numbering system used in the Greek Septuagint and Latin Vulgate translations of the Bible, this psalm is Psalm 81. In Latin, it is known as "Deus stetit in synagoga deorum". It is one of the 12 Psalms of Asaph. IThe New King James Version describes it as "a plea for justice"; Alexander Kirkpatrick sees it as "a vision of God as the Judge of judges". In the slightly different numbering system used in the Greek Septuagint and Latin Vulgate translations of the Bible, this psalm is Psalm 81.

The psalm forms a regular part of Jewish, Catholic, Lutheran, Anglican and other Protestant liturgies. It has been set to music.

Text

Hebrew Bible version 
Following is the Hebrew text of Psalm 82:

King James Version 
 God standeth in the congregation of the mighty; he judgeth among the gods.
 How long will ye judge unjustly, and accept the persons of the wicked? Selah.
 Defend the poor and fatherless: do justice to the afflicted and needy.
 Deliver the poor and needy: rid them out of the hand of the wicked.
 They know not, neither will they understand; they walk on in darkness: all the foundations of the earth are out of course.
 I have said, Ye are gods; and all of you are children of the most High.
 But ye shall die like men, and fall like one of the princes.
 Arise, O God, judge the earth: for thou shalt inherit all nations.

Contextual interpretation 
This psalm originates in the context of the ancient Hebrews, and their Ancient Near Eastern environment. Kirkpatrick observes how it "sets forth, in a highly poetical and imaginative form, the responsibility of earthly judges to the Supreme Judge." The final verse of the Psalm, verse 8, has God in the future tense "inheriting the nations", where elsewhere in the psalms, "the Son" inherited the nations in Psalm 2, and the believing community inherits the nations in Psalms 25 and 37. God already possesses the nations but in some sense inherits them as well.

Uses

Judaism 
Psalm 82 is the psalm of the day in the Shir Shel Yom on Tuesday.
It is recited on Hoshana Rabbah.
Verse 1 is part of Mishnah Talmud 7:4  and is found in Pirkei Avot Chapter 3, no. 7.

Christianity 
Jesus quotes verse 6 in John : "I said, 'You are gods.'" Jesus uses this text to assert that he is not blaspheming when he calls himself the Son of God. The second part of verse 6, "All of you are sons of the Most High", does not appear in the text quoted by John. Quoting Bishop Westcott, Kirkpatrick says of this text: "The fact that it was possible for men so to represent God as to be called gods or divine was a foreshadowing of the Incarnation. 'There lay already in the Law the germ of the truth which Christ announced, the union of God and man.'"

Jesus alludes directly to Psalm 82, where the elohim (gods) receive the word of God in the form of judgment and condemnation. Against his accusers, Jesus was appealing to the precedent already established in the Torah, which referred to God's holy ones, or his divine council, as "gods" (elohim). In the Church of England's Book of Common Prayer, this psalm is appointed to be read in the evening of the 16th day of the month.

Musical settings 
Heinrich Schütz set Psalm 82 in a metred version in German, "Singet mit Freuden unserm Gott", SWV 179, as part of the Becker Psalter, first published in 1628.

Norma Wendelburg composed a choral setting in English, "Arise, O God, to Judge the Earth" for mixed choir and optional organ in 1973.

References

Bibliography

External links 

 
 
  in Hebrew and English, Mechon-mamre
 Text of Psalm 82 according to the 1928 Psalter
 A psalm of Asaph. God takes a stand in the divine council, gives judgment in the midst of the gods. (text and footnotes) United States Conference of Catholic Bishops
 Psalm 82 – Earthly Judges Before the Great Judge (text and detailed commentary) enduringword.com
 Psalm 82:1 (introduction and text) Bible study tools
 Psalm 82 / Refrain: Arise, O God, and judge the earth. Church of England
 Psalm 82 Bible gateway
 Charles H. Spurgeon: Psalm 82 (commentary) spurgeon.org

082